Vase of Flowers is an oil painting by the Welsh artist Gwen John (1876–1939).

Description
The undated work was painted in the early part of the 20th century. It was donated to the National Library of Wales by the Contemporary Art Society of Wales (CASW) in 1957.

The subject of the painting is a vase of pink and white flowers on a wooden table with a few white petals falling onto the table. A pink cloth is draped over a table in the background. It is an oil on board painting using the style of dry painting with an impasto brush. It may have been painted in her lounge.

Analysis
Gwen John's biographer Cecily Langdale says the painting probably dates from the late 1910s. A similar, earlier painting by John called Flowers is now held by Manchester Art Gallery.

John's biographer Mary Taubman describes this painting as a "classical and conceptual image and has the appearance of being a considered  and reflective development on the original."

Europeana 280 
In April 2016 the painting was selected as one of Wales' ten iconic paintings as part of the Europeana art project

References 

Vase of Flowers on Art UK website

1910s paintings
Paintings by Gwen John
Still life paintings